Richard Fischer (27 January 1917 – 1969) was an Austrian international footballer.

References

1917 births
1969 deaths
Association football forwards
Austrian footballers
Austria international footballers
First Vienna FC players
Austrian football managers
First Vienna FC managers